This is a list of cities and towns in Chad. In brackets there is the Arabic name of the city.

Alphabetical list

Abéché (أبشي)
Abou-Deïa (أبو ديا)
Adé (أدي)
Adré (أدري)
Am Dam (أم دام)
Amdjarass (أم جرس)
Am Timan (أم تيمان)
Aouzou (أوزو)
Arada (أردا)
Ati (أتي)
Baïbokoum (بيبوكمم)
Bardaï (برداي)
Bébédjia (بيبيدخيا)
Béboto (بيبوتو)
Beinamar (بينامار)
Bénoye (بينوي)
Béré (بيري)
Biltine (بلتن)
Bitkine (نيتكتن)
Bokoro (بوكورو)
Bol (بول)
Bongor (بونقور)
Bousso (بوسو)
Djédaa (جيدا)
Doba (دوبا)
Dourbali (دوربالي)
Fada (فادا)
Faya-Largeau (فايا لارجو)
Fianga (فيانكا)
Gaoui (غاوي)
Goré (غوري)
Goundi (غوندي)
Gounou Gaya (غونو غايا)
Goz Beïda (قوز بيدا)
Guélengdeng (جليندينغ)
Guéréda (غيريدا)
Haraze (حراز)
Iriba (هريبا)
Kélo (كيلو)
Koro Toro (كورو تورو)
Koumra (قمرة)
Kyabé (كيابي)
Laï (لادي)
Léré (ليري)
Linia (لينيا)
Mangalmé (مانقالمي)
Mao (ماو)
Massaguet (مساقط)
Massakory (ماساكوري)
Massenya (ماسينيا)
Melfi (ملفي)
Moïssala (مويسالا)
Moundou (ماوندو)
Mongo (مونقو)
Moussoro (موسورو)
N'Djamena (انجامينا)
Ngama (نجمة)
Ouara (وارا)
Oum Hadjer (أم هاجر)	
Pala (بالا)
Sarh (ساره)
Zouar (زوار)

Largest cities
N'Djamena - انْجَمِينا) 951,418)
Moundou - 137,929 (موندو)
Sarh - 137,251 (ساره)
Abéché - 97,963 (أبشي)
Kélo - 57,859 (كيلو)
Koumra - 37,867 (قمرة)
Pala - 49,461 (بالا)
Am Timan - 52,270 (أم تيمان)
Mongo - 40,233 (مونقو)
Bongor - 30 518 (بونقور)

See also
List of cities by country
Subdivisions of Chad

Cities
 
Chad, List of cities in
Chad

simple:Chad#Cities